James Oh (born April 5, 1982) is an American professional golfer.

Oh was born in Los Angeles, California. In 1996, he became the youngest golfer to qualify for the U.S. Amateur at age 14 years, 4 months, 20 days, one month younger than Bobby Jones in 1916. His record was broken by Joseph Bramlett in 2002. Oh won the 1998 U.S. Junior Amateur defeating Aaron Baddeley in the finals. Oh and Phil Mickelson are the only multiple winners of the Rolex Tournament Of Champions in American Junior Golf Association history.

Oh played college golf at the University of Nevada, Las Vegas for one year before turning professional in 2001.

In 2003, Oh Monday-qualified and went on to win the Mark Christopher Charity Classic on the Nationwide Tour. At age 21 years, 5 months and 27 days, he became the youngest winner on the Nationwide Tour. Jason Day broke Oh's record in 2007. Oh played the Nationwide Tour from 2003 to 2006. He played on the PGA Tour in 2009 after earning his card in Q School. His best finish was T-39 at the AT&T Pebble Beach National Pro-Am.

Oh is currently a golf instructor in his hometown of Lakewood, California. His clientele consists of some of the best juniors and amateurs in the world as well as PGA Tour, LPGA Tour, and Korn Ferry Tour professionals.

Amateur wins
1998 U.S. Junior Amateur

Professional wins (1)

Nationwide Tour wins (1)

Nationwide Tour playoff record (1–0)

See also
2008 PGA Tour Qualifying School graduates

References

External links

American male golfers
UNLV Rebels men's golfers
PGA Tour golfers
Golfers from Los Angeles
People from Lakewood, California
1982 births
Living people